Grace Building may refer to:
 W. R. Grace Building, New York City, New York, U.S.
 Grace Building (Sydney), Australia